Hamotus is a genus of ant-loving beetles in the family Staphylinidae. There are about nine described species in Hamotus.

Species
These nine species belong to the genus Hamotus:
 Hamotus electrae Park, 1942
 Hamotus elongatus (Brendel, 1890)
 Hamotus hirtus Raffray, 1905
 Hamotus latericius Aubé, 1844
 Hamotus nodicollis Raffray, 1883
 Hamotus opimus Fletcher, 1932
 Hamotus populus Chandler, 1974
 Hamotus sanguinipes Schaufuss, 1888
 Hamotus soror Raffray, 1904

References

Further reading

External links

 

Pselaphitae
Articles created by Qbugbot